In Western tonal music theory, an augmented octave is the sum of a perfect octave and an augmented unison or chromatic semitone. It is the interval between two notes, with the same note letter on staff positions an octave apart, whose alterations cause them, in ordinary equal temperament, to be thirteen semitones apart. In other words, it is a perfect octave which has been widened by a half-step, such as B and B or C and C; it is a compound augmented unison. It is the enharmonic equivalent of a minor ninth.

See also 
 False relation
 List of musical intervals
 List of pitch intervals
 Ninth#Minor ninth

References 

Augmented intervals
Octaves